Clinton Peak is a high mountain summit in the Mosquito Range of the Rocky Mountains of North America.

Mountain

See also

List of Colorado mountain ranges
List of Colorado mountain summits
List of Colorado fourteeners
List of Colorado 4000 meter prominent summits
List of the most prominent summits of Colorado
List of Colorado county high points

References

External links

Mountains of Colorado
Mountains of Lake County, Colorado
Mountains of Park County, Colorado
Pike National Forest
San Isabel National Forest
North American 4000 m summits
Great Divide of North America